The Dorsey-Palmer House is a historic home located near Hagerstown, Washington County, Maryland, United States. It was built about 1800, and is a two-story, five-bay fieldstone dwelling with a two-story, four-bay rear wing. The house features a double porch extending across the front elevation and large transoms over entrances on the front.

The Dorsey-Palmer House was listed on the National Register of Historic Places in 1978.

References

External links
, including photo from 1974, at Maryland Historical Trust

Houses on the National Register of Historic Places in Maryland
Houses in Hagerstown, Maryland
Georgian architecture in Maryland
Houses completed in 1800
National Register of Historic Places in Washington County, Maryland